This is a list of prisons within Tianjin municipality of the People's Republic of China.

Sources 

Buildings and structures in Tianjin
Tianjin